Ian Ross (26 January 1947 – 9 February 2019) was a Scottish professional footballer and football manager. He spent his entire playing career in England, including spells with Liverpool, Aston Villa and Peterborough United. As a manager, he won two Icelandic championships with Valur in 1985 and 1987 and also managed in the English and Scottish leagues.

Career
A utility player, Ross's debut was for Liverpool on 14 January 1967 at Sheffield Wednesday in the First Division. Although never establishing himself as a first team choice, Ross served Liverpool well, often being used to mark the stars of opposing teams. He then moved to Aston Villa for £60,000 in February 1972, where he captained the side that gained promotion to the top flight and also won the League Cup.

After falling out of favour at Villa, he had spells on loan at Notts County and Northampton Town before joining Peterborough United in December 1976. Here, he amassed over 100 appearances during two and a half seasons, in which he also served the club in a coaching role.

He joined First Division Wolverhampton Wanderers in 1979 primarily as a coach, following his former Peterborough manager John Barnwell. He remained a registered player but never played a first team game for the club. He stepped in as caretaker manager after Barnwell's eventual sacking in January 1982, taking charge of five games, losing all. Ross left the club soon after, joining Hereford United in a similar role, though here he did make 15 first team appearances during the 1982–83 season.

He moved to Iceland in 1984 to manage Valur who he led to the Icelandic championship in 1985 and 1987. On 30 September 1987, he signed a two-year contract with KR where he stayed until February 1991, when he took a job as an assistant manager to Huddersfield Town. He served as the manager of Huddersfield from 1992 to 1993 before returning to Iceland in November 1993 when he took over as manager of Keflavík. He unexpectectly resigned from Keflavík on 2 July 1994. He subsequently managed Berwick Rangers in 1996.

Death
Ross died on 9 February 2019.

Honours 
Aston Villa
FL Third Division: 1971–72
FL Second Division: Promotion 1974–75
Football League Cup: 1974–75

Valur
Úrvalsdeild: 1985, 1987

References

External links
 LFChistory.net player profile

1947 births
2019 deaths
Scottish footballers
English Football League players
Liverpool F.C. players
Notts County F.C. players
Northampton Town F.C. players
Berwick Rangers F.C. managers
Scottish expatriate sportspeople in Iceland
Peterborough United F.C. players
Wolverhampton Wanderers F.C. players
Hereford United F.C. players
Aston Villa F.C. players
Huddersfield Town A.F.C. managers
Scottish football managers
Scottish expatriate football managers
Expatriate football managers in Iceland
Valur (men's football) managers
Knattspyrnufélag Reykjavíkur managers
Scottish Football League managers
Knattspyrnudeild Keflavík managers
Association football defenders